Darayem is a village in Badakhshan Province in north-eastern Afghanistan.

Climate
Darayem features a warm-summer humid continental climate (Köppen climate classification: Dsb). Precipitation mostly falls in spring and winter.

References 

Populated places in Darayim District